Oragadam has developed from being a rural area along the Redhills high road to become one of the important residential localities of Ambattur. It was a part of the erstwhile Ambattur Municipality until October 2011when, in line with a G.O., Oragadam become part of the zone 7, Ambattur, of the Greater Chennai Corporation. Though Oragadam has grown from being a less-known suburb to a nominally decent suburban centre, it still has not grown on par with the other localities in Ambattur itself. For instance, it still lacks proper roads and connectivity albeit the Chennai Corporation has been carrying out infrastructure projects which are expected to reach completion soon.

Neighbourhoods in Chennai